Larry Rose III (born September 9, 1995) is an American football running back who is currently a free agent. He played college football at New Mexico State. He was signed by the Tennessee Titans as an undrafted free agent in 2018.

Early years
A native of Fairfield, Texas, Rose attended Fairfield High School.

College career
Rose III became the starting running back for the Aggies as a true freshman. He was named an honorable mention All-Sun Belt Conference.

Source:

Professional career

Tennessee Titans
Rose III signed with the Tennessee Titans as an undrafted free agent on May 2, 2018. On May 14, 2018, Rose was waived by the Titans.

Los Angeles Rams
On May 15, 2018, Rose was claimed off waivers by the Los Angeles Rams. He was waived on June 18, 2018. He was re-signed on August 28, 2018, only to be waived four days later on September 1.

Arizona Hotshots
Rose signed with the Arizona Hotshots of the AAF in 2018. He was waived on February 21, 2019, after playing in one game.

Winnipeg Blue Bombers
Rose signed with the Winnipeg Blue Bombers of the Canadian Football League on February 25, 2019. He was released on April 24, but re-signed on April 29. He was released before the start of the regular season on June 9, but was re-signed on September 4. He was moved down to the practice roster on September 20, and was released on September 24.

Los Angeles Wildcats
Rose was drafted in the 5th round of the 2020 XFL Draft to the Los Angeles Wildcats. He had his contract terminated when the league suspended operations on April 10, 2020.

New Orleans Breakers 
Rose was selected in the 27th round of the 2022 USFL Draft by the New Orleans Breakers of the United States Football League. He was transferred to the team's practice squad before the start of the regular season on April 16, and remained on the inactive roster on April 22. He was transferred to the active roster on April 30. The Breakers moved Rose back to the inactive roster on May 12. On February 9, 2023, Rose was released by the Breakers.

References

External links
New Mexico State Aggies bio

1995 births
Living people
Players of American football from Texas
People from Fairfield, Texas
American football running backs
New Mexico State Aggies football players
Los Angeles Rams players
Arizona Hotshots players
Winnipeg Blue Bombers players
Los Angeles Wildcats (XFL) players
New Orleans Breakers (2022) players